Celeste Yvonne Taylor (born June 20, 2001) is an American college basketball player for the Duke Blue Devils of the Atlantic Coast Conference (ACC). She previously played for the Texas Longhorns.

High school career
Taylor played varsity basketball for Valley Stream South High School in Valley Stream, New York in seventh grade. One year later, she transferred Long Island Lutheran Middle and High School in Brookville, New York, where she became a starter as a freshman. As a senior, Taylor was named New York Gatorade Player of the Year. She was selected to play in the McDonald's All-American Game and Jordan Brand Classic. Taylor was named Newsday Long Island Player of the Year in her final two years. Rated a five-star recruit by ESPN, she committed to playing college basketball for Texas over offers from Stanford, Notre Dame, Ohio State and South Carolina, among other programs.

College career
As a freshman at Texas, Taylor averaged 9.3 points and 4.8 rebounds per game, leading the team with 31 three-pointers. She was named to the Big 12 All-Freshman Team. She averaged 12.3 points, 4.9 rebounds and 2.1 steals per game as a sophomore, earning All-Big 12 honorable mention. For her junior season, Taylor transferred to Duke and averaged 11 points, 5.5 rebounds and 2.1 assists per game.

National team career
Taylor won a gold medal with the United States national under-16 team at the 2017 FIBA Under-16 Women's Americas Championship in Argentina. She started in all five games and averaged 4.8 points and 3.8 rebounds per game. Taylor played at the 2018 FIBA Under-17 Women's Basketball World Cup in Belarus, averaging 6.1 points and 4.1 rebounds per game en route to a gold medal. She won a third gold medal with the national under-19 team at the 2019 FIBA Under-19 Women's Basketball World Cup in Thailand, where she averaged five points and 2.6 rebounds per game.

References

External links
Duke Blue Devils bio
Texas Longhorns bio

Living people
American women's basketball players
Basketball players from New York City
Sportspeople from Queens, New York
Guards (basketball)
Duke Blue Devils women's basketball players
Texas Longhorns women's basketball players
McDonald's High School All-Americans
Valley Stream South High School alumni
2001 births